Easterling Correctional Facility is a state prison for men located in Clio, Barbour County, Alabama. The facility has an operating capacity of 1267 and was first opened in 1990.

References

Prisons in Alabama
Buildings and structures in Barbour County, Alabama
1990 establishments in Alabama